Dentons Rodyk & Davidson LLP is one of Singapore's largest law firms, with around 180 lawyers who are qualified in various jurisdictions such as those of Singapore, Australia, England and Wales and India, and with offices in Singapore and Myanmar. 

The firm is Singapore's first and oldest law practice and celebrated its 160th year as one of Singapore's largest full service law firms in 2021. It traces its beginnings to the partnership of Woods & Davidson, founded by Robert Carr Woods and James Guthrie Davidson in 1861. After the death of Woods, Bernard Rodyk joined Davidson in 1877. The firm was renamed Rodyk & Davidson. The firm was the first foreign law office to be granted a license for Shanghai and established its Shanghai office in 1996.

They practice in corporate law, finance law, intellectual property & technology, litigation & arbitration, and real estate with a specialist practice in competition.

The firm is the sole Singapore member of the World Law Group and the Pacific Rim Advisory Council, both global legal networks.

History
The firm is registered under the Limited Liability Partnership Act, on and from April 2007.

In 2016, the firm integrated with global law firm Dentons and was renamed Dentons Rodyk & Davidson LLP.

Main Practice Groups
The firm specialises in the following areas:

 Corporate
 Finance
 Intellectual Property & Technology
 Litigation & Arbitration
 Real Estate

Notable attorneys

Philip Jeyaretnam, Judicial Commissioner of the Supreme Court of Singapore.
Edmund Leow, Senior Partner and former Judicial Commissioner of the Supreme Court of Singapore.
Lok Vi Ming, former Senior Partner.
Robert Carr Woods, founding partner and first editor of the Straits Times.

References

External links
Official website of Rodyk & Davidson LLP
History of Robert Carr Woods

Law firms of Singapore
Law firms established in 1861